Marco Pillini (late nineteenth century) was an Italian painter, mainly of genre subjects.

Biography
He studied at the Albertina Academy of Fine Arts of Turin, but for many years was a resident of Paris. He dedicated himself almost exclusively and was prolific in Genre painting, his canvas had a sharp simplicity. Among his works: Un tamburo intempestivo; Un precoce autoritario; Breton Youth: Poor Breton Family; Fratellanza. He exhibited in London, Paris, and Italy. His wife, Margherita Pillini, was also a painter.

References

Italian genre painters
19th-century Italian painters
Italian male painters
Artists from Paris
Accademia Albertina alumni
19th-century Italian male artists